Mohla is a census town in the Indian state of Chhattisgarh. It serves as the district headquarter of the newly created Mohla-Manpur-Ambagarh Chowki district.

The population of the town is 4,952. It is 75 km away from Rajnandgaon. and 25 km away from Ambagarh chowki.

References 

Cities and towns in Chhattisgarh